The Church of Saint Thomas is a Syriac Catholic church building located in the city of Jerusalem in the Holy Land. It serves as the cathedral and headquarters of the Syriac Catholic Patriarchal Exarchate of Jerusalem. The exarchate moved several times and is now at the House of Abraham at Ras al-Amud in East Jerusalem.

History
The Syriac Catholic Patriarchal Exarchate of Jerusalem was created in 1890 after the Syriac Catholic Church accepted the Pope in Rome as its head in 1782. The Syriac Catholic Church is thus one of the first communities in Christianity. It had shares the Liturgy of Saint James and the Syriac language spoken by Jesus and the apostles. Saint Thomas was the apostle who preached in Mesopotamia (now Iraq and north of Syria and south of Turkey).

The wars and revolutions that took place between 1900 and 1973 caused the headquarters of the exarchate to be moved several times. In 1948, it had its center at the Damascus Gate of Jerusalem's Old City, then moved to Bethlehem, and 1965 again to Jerusalem. In 1986, the Church of Saint Thomas was built at Ras al-Amud in East Jerusalem, along with other facilities, including a building for pilgrims and a youth center.

See also
 Catholic Church in Israel
 Catholic Church in Palestine

References

Assyrians in Israel
Churches completed in 1986
Cathedrals in Jerusalem
Eastern Catholic cathedrals in Israel
Eastern Catholic cathedrals in the State of Palestine
Eastern Catholic church buildings in Jerusalem
Syriac Catholic cathedrals